IGA (supermarkets)
International Grooving & Grinding Association (IGGA)
James Wani Igga - Vice President of South Sudan